Magliano de' Marsi is a comune and town in the province of L'Aquila in the Abruzzo region of southern-central Italy. The town is in the historical region Marsica.

Main sights
Church of Santa Lucia, in late Gothic-Romanesque style, with Baroque elements.
14th century church of Madonna di Loreto
Santa Maria in Valle Porclaneta
Monumental tomb of King Perseus, the last king of the Macedonians. Buried along the Via Valeria near Magliano de' Marsi (Aquila), as indicated on table II SE of the page 145 of the Military Geographical Institute's map.

Twin towns
 Villa Sant'Angelo, Italy

References

 
Marsica